The cinnamon-browed melidectes (Melidectes ochromelas), also known as the cinnamon-browed honeyeater, is a species of bird in the family Meliphagidae.  It is found in New Guinea.  Its natural habitat is subtropical or tropical moist montane forest.

References

cinnamon-browed melidectes
Birds of New Guinea
cinnamon-browed melidectes
Taxonomy articles created by Polbot